Washington González (born 6 December 1955) is a Uruguayan footballer. He played in 32 matches for the Uruguay national football team from 1978 to 1983. He was also part of Uruguay's squad for the 1979 Copa América tournament.

References

1955 births
Living people
Uruguayan footballers
Uruguay international footballers
Place of birth missing (living people)
Association football defenders